Jane Furst (born 21 July 1944) is a contemporary English artist.

Her work draws upon an interest in artists from the distant past, for example Northern Renaissance, from whom she borrows images, and also the study of natural form. She has done many etchings and Mezzotints inspired by the drawings and lithographs of Ernst Haeckel. She is interested in showing the monumentality of small things, such as the microscopic Radiolarian discovered by Haeckel.

One of the art books published by Furst and her daughter under the imprint Furst & King is on her late husband called Michael Copus, Museum Artist.

Collections
Furst's work is held in the permanent collections of the Victoria and Albert Museum and the Wellcome Collection.

Gallery

References

External links
 
 

1944 births
Living people
20th-century British women artists
21st-century British women artists
20th-century South African women artists
21st-century South African women artists
Alumni of the Royal College of Art
British contemporary artists
People from Durban